Samay: When Time Strikes is a 2003 Indian Hindi-language thriller film starring Sushmita Sen and Sushant Singh. It was inspired by the Hollywood film Se7en, starring Morgan Freeman and Brad Pitt.

Plot
ACP Malvika Chauhan (Sushmita Sen) is a widowed cop with a 10-year-old daughter. She is saddled with the murder case of a reputed businessman, where the killer has left no evidence. Before she can get into the investigation, a famous heroine is killed. Malvika suspects that it might be the work of a serial killer.

Investigation reveals that the victims were not connected with each other. Plus, even the suspects with motives were not near the crime scenes. Suddenly Malvika realizes that somebody is stalking her. Malvika accosts her stalker, but he reveals that he was just doing it for a criminal named Suleman Bhai. As Suleman has that much expertise to kill someone without leaving evidence, Malvika thinks she has got a killer for at least one case. But when Malvika goes to Suleman's house, she finds Suleman dead.

Again out of leads, Malvika starts going through case files of all 3 victims. She finds 4 connections: 

 All were the best people in their fields.
 All had a poor eyesight with eye power of -2.
 All ordered their spectacles from the same shop.
 The position of their hands on the crime scene indicated their time of death (12 am, 3 pm, and 6 pm).

Malvika goes to the shop to investigate, where the assistant says that her eyesight is perfect, but her vision is very weak. Malvika does not realize what he means, but after learning that the assistant did not turn up that day, she realizes that she talked with the killer (whom she could not see, as the room was dark). Later, she finds out from the list of customers that a person named Amod Parekh (Jackie Shroff), also with eye power -2, visited the same optical shop on the days when all the three murdered persons visited the shop, and believes him to be the killer.

A frustrated Malvika sends her associate Satya (Sushant Singh) to investigate the whereabouts of the killer, while she tries to figure out who the next target is. She finds that a renowned musician, who also has a power of -2, is the customer of the shop and is performing the same evening. Malvika arranges for a tight security, but the musician is not killed by the killer even after the given time (9 pm).

Meanwhile, Malvika's associate finds out the killer's address. Amod reveals himself to Malvika in front of the musician. Amod explains that he was also a graduate from the '94 batch of the police academy, the same batch from which Malvika graduated. He explains that his credentials were much better than Malvika's, but he was toppled, as he had poor eyesight with power -2.

Amod vents out his anger by saying that this same fault did not affect the lives of his victims, in fact, they became famous. He also goes on to say that he did not want to kill them, but time was not on their side as somebody else, too had a motive to kill them. Malvika thinks that he is trying to prove that she has lost, and he has proved himself a genius, if not as a cop, then as a killer.

Malvika asks why Amod did not kill the musician. Suddenly her associate arrives with a broken pair of glasses retrieved from Amod's house. Amod tells her that her daughter was the perfect daughter of the best cop. He clarifies that he killed her daughter instead (9 pm), who also has an eyesight power of -2 and came to the same optical shop in the same evening. He again taunts Malvika that her eyesight is perfect, but her vision is very weak as she didn't notice her daughter's name in the customers' list. Malvika's associate begs her to not to kill the killer, as he wants her to do the same. However, an angry Malvika shoots the killer dead (12 am).

Cast
 Sushmita Sen as ACP Malvika Chauhan
 Sushant Singh as Inspector Satya Anand
 Jackie Shroff as Amod Parekh (Guest Appearance)
 Rajesh Khera as Postmortem Doctor
 Dinesh Lamba as Sub Inspector Rafique
 Shishir Sharma as Police Commissioner 
 Tushar Dalvi as Dr. Ravi Ghatge
 Barkha Singh as Anjalee Chauhan
 Deepak Dobriyal as Production Designer on Film Set
 Lucy Bartholomew as Rithika Sabhrawal

Soundtrack
"Aaj Ki Raat": Sneha Pant
"Jab Andhera Hota Hai": Vaishali Samant
"Laila Laila": Sowmya Raoh
"Last Clue": Instrumental
"Zindagi": Sowmya Raoh
"Losing To Win" (Zindagi Reprise)	
"Man Hunt": Instrumental
"The Chase": Instrumental
"The Theme": Instrumental

Reception
Samay was well received at the box office, and Sushmita Sen was praised for her professional portrayal of ACP Malavika Chauhan. Reviews praised the well-written screenplay, and its storyline kept its audiences guessing until the last minute.

Samay won a National Award in 2004 for Best Editing by Aarif Sheikh.

While not reaching cult classic status, Samay became popular among those who follow the thriller genre. Despite its inspiration by Seven, the movie kept its originality.

References

External links
 
 

2003 films
2000s Hindi-language films
 Indian detective films
 Films scored by Sandeep Chowta
Films whose editor won the Best Film Editing National Award
Indian crime thriller films
2003 crime thriller films
Indian mystery thriller films
Indian police films
2000s police procedural films
2000s mystery thriller films